Hydnellum compactum is a tooth fungus in the family Bankeraceae. It is found in Europe, where it grows in deciduous forest, typically under beech. Fruit bodies of the fungus grow singly or in groups. The surface texture is initially felt-like before becoming pitted and rough in age. On the fertile cap underside (the hymenium) are white to purple-brown, curved spines up to 5 mm long. The color is whitish at first but gradually turns dark brown to blackish. Its spores measure 5.5–6 by 3.5–4.5 µm, and feature tubercles that sometimes have a sunken tip. It is considered endangered in Switzerland.

See also
List of fungi by conservation status

References

Fungi described in 1800
Fungi of Europe
Inedible fungi
compactum
Taxa named by Christiaan Hendrik Persoon